Educational reform in occupied Japan (August 1945-April 1952) encompasses changes in philosophy and goals of education; nature of the student-teacher relationship; coeducation; the structure of compulsory education system; textbook content and procurement system; personnel at the Ministry of Education (MEXT); kanji script reform; and establishment of a university in every prefecture. The reforms were directed by the Education Division (Joseph C. Trainor) of the Civil Information and Education Section (CIE; Kermit R. Dyke, followed by Donald M. Nugent) of the Supreme Commander for the Allied Powers (SCAP, in Japanese: "GHQ"). Also influential were the two Reports of the United States Education Mission to Japan (March 1946; September 1950).

Magnitude of the problem
During World War II, many Japanese students were mobilized for the war effort, practicing military drills, working in factories, while schools became factory-like production centers. Bombings destroyed some schools, and others were used as refuge centers. After Japan's defeat, the occupation forces (SCAP) undertook the task of reconstruction.

SCAP philosophy regarded a reformed educational system as vital for Japan to become a democratic nation. Traditional Japanese methods were nearly opposite to that of the United States: control of schools was highly centralized, rote memorization of book knowledge without much interaction described the standard student-teacher relationship, and the study texts were described as boring. The ratio of school years was made to resemble that of the United States' which was 6 years Primary education (elementary schools) : 3 years Lower Secondary education (junior high schools); 3 years Upper Secondary education (senior high schools) : 4 years Higher Education (Universities or colleges). Over the period of occupation, these and many other trends were changed. A less centralized hierarchy of school administrators was introduced; totally unprecedented, parents were allowed to vote for school boards. A new textbook industry was created.

Much of the reform was focused on conditioning students to more readily accept democratic, liberal and egalitarian ideals, directly competing with the prevailing hierarchical structures deeply ingrained in every level of Japanese society, from family life to government institutions. Classes became co-educational single track system composed of 9 compulsory years, moving away from the former 6-year, single-sex, multi-track system. The use of kanji script was overhauled and greatly simplified, eliminating all but 1,850 more commonly used characters, referred to as the tōyō kanjihyō.

Initially, before the Japanese Ministry of Education (MEXT) and Allied command's Civil Information and Education Section (CI&E) produced new textbooks to replace them, narratives in existing Japanese textbooks found to extol feudalistic, nationalistic, militaristic, authoritarian, State Shinto-religious, or anti-American views were censored during class by students through a process of Suminuri-Kyōkasho, or "blackening-over textbooks" with ink, under orders of the Supreme Commander for the Allied Powers (SCAP).

Reform Philosophy 
The Civil Information and Education Division (CIE) under SCAP followed seven principles for implementing education reforms in occupied Japan. The CIE's objective was to eliminate practices that contradicted the tenets of democracy and employ democratic models. Some of the CIE's concerns were the 6-3-3-4 school ladder, core curriculum, the program of tests and policies, graduation requirements, collaborative style of learning, and a new course in social studies.

The primary strategy was to establish standards of education common among democratic societies. CIE was aware patterns built from these theories were relative to circumstances. Principles were general, but their expression was comparative. Eventually, these standards became benchmarks for the CIE to ascertain genuine progress in education reforms. The position was militarism and ultra-nationalism (promoting Japanese cultural unity) must not be a segment of school curriculum. The Division removed the military from academic institutions. Decision-making was left to the civilian population. The Americans decentralized administration and authority. At the same time, equality was practiced in education, and discrimination was eliminated. The basis of education must be facts and the experimental method applied whenever necessary. Last but not least teaching must be regarded as a profession that requires special training programs. These principles were published in three documents during the early part of the occupation: The Civil Affairs Handbook (1944), Education in Japan (1946), and Report of the United States Mission to Japan (1946).

Efforts to develop a comprehensive program of a democratic educational platform had to be deferred until after The USA Education Mission to Japan headed by George L. Stoddard concluded its visit in March 1946. This delegation included 26 education experts sent by the government upon the request of occupation leaders. A Japanese team worked hand in hand with the American group.

Adopting mixed-sex education 

Under the rule of occupation by the Supreme Commander for the Allied Powers after World War II and the reformed School Education Act of Japan, former secondary schools were converted into , established as part of the democratization policy. At that time many public schools with single-sex education were made into mixed-sex education with exception of some local public entity|local government including Miyagi prefecture, Fukushima prefecture, Gumma prefecture, and Saitama prefecture. Most private schools applying single-sex education reserved students' specification nationwide while they accepted conversion to upper secondary school, with cases of continued education through middle school and upper secondary school as a single system.

Rare cases were seen with those administrations of Yamaguchi Prefecture, where former high schools were integrated with nearby former secondary schools and transformed into upper secondary schools under a new school system. A typical case of Osaka Prefecture converted those upper secondary schools under its administration into the new system; however, instead of integrating with neighboring junior/upper secondary schools, they replaced the whole population of students and teachers in school A with those who had belonged to school B.

Amami Islands 

Amami Islands left Japanese administrative power in 1946 (Showa 21), and the Provisional Government of Northern Ryukyu Islands (ja) introduced their new school system in 1949, delayed by one year.

Transition measures from the former to the new school systems 
Various transitional measures have been taken to alleviate the turmoil caused by major changes in the school system by the academic reform. A transitional system was applied between 1947 (Showa 22) and 1950 (Showa 25), when schools consolidated under the former and the new systems coexisted.

Transition measures for the former primary and secondary education (1946–1950) 
Public schools

Up to March 1946, compulsory education in the secondary level was offered up to the senior level at public  , a level providing lower secondary education equivalent to Senior elementary school called . Graduates were admitted to those surviving Middle schools (ja) or  under former system. Starting in 1935, in some public primary schools, continued education for working youth was offered along with military drills at 
Youth Schools  or (ja).

In August 1945, there were three sub-systems to middle schools; for boys , for girls , and for both sexes vocational school . It was in April 1947 (Showa 22) a measure was taken to provide  to each faculty of public middle school: although new students admitted in April 1947 were admitted to the current junior high schools at once, those entered middle school level in 1945 and 1946 (sophomore and senior students) were advanced to the attached middle schools as a transition phase to secondary higher education.

Private schools

The private middle schools were given choice of whether they will change to new school system at once, or to apply transitional system. There were cases that private schools decided to continue the attached middle school after 1950, and they offered continued six-year period of secondary education.

University of Tokyo Junior High School

The freshmen of 1946 became isolated as no new students followed them under former school regulation, and in their senior year in 1948 (Showa 23), the school was reformed into the University of Tokyo Junior High School, recruited new freshmen and sophomores to fill the classrooms. It is reformed later to become the current  affiliated to the University of Tokyo.
 1946 (Showa 21)

 A 6th grader in shotoka, kokumin gakko  would enter a reformed junior high in 1947, then graduate and would enter an upper secondary in 1950;
 A 1st grader in Kotoka, kokumin gakko  would transfer to a 2nd grade in a reformed junior high in 1947, then graduate and would enter an upper secondary in 1949;
 A 1st grader at Youth school: in Futsuka  Regular course would transfer to a 2nd grade in a reformed junior high in 1947, then graduate and would enter an upper secondary in 1949;

Higher education : 1948–1950, converting to modern universities 

 along with Kyusei kotogakko had been established as the primary higher education for those who would continue to universities. For Kyusei kotogakko, the senior year graduates, or the 3rd graders who commenced from kotogakko in 1947 were the last generation finishing the full three years' term of high school education. They applied for admission examination and entered colleges and universities in the spring of 1949.

The idea of 1949 educational system reform was to reform so-called high schools under the old system as colleges and universities. As shinsei daigaku or universities under a new system, those high schools under the old system including single major semmon gakko and shihangakko for future educators were renamed.

For students, those who had studied for the full four years' term and qualify as  graduates in 1947 were offered two options. They either could enter kyuseikoko and transfer, or enter shinsei koko, the present day high school and continue to prepare for college/ university. As for special transition measure, those 3rd graders in old high schools were also given those two options. Like on the Komaba campus of University of Tokyo, there were rivalry seen among those high school students of Daiichi Kotogakko against the university students. While the last kyusei daigaku, or old system universities admitted students till 1950, there were considerable number of graduates of old system high schools who either failed at the admission examinations or postponed their applications. Universities established administered by the new system held special examinations for those graduates of past academic years as transfer students.

Medical schools 
In 1949 (Showa 24), under the academic system reform, the qualification for admission to the medical and dental departments became "a person who has completed two years of college and who meets specific requirements (in defined subjects and credits)". Therefore, a single department (medical/dental) schools and nursing schools transformed and adapted those  under  
as two years' undergraduate course after the academic reformation. The four-year university which had established the “Science Department” made a two-years' preparatory courses, called , or the “Preparatory Course, Science Department”, especially for medical and dental students: requirements of two-year university graduates were hence cleared. 
preparatory two-years colleges
:Fr:Loi sur l'université
The anomalous state of mixed students with academic achievement under the new and old systems lasted by 1955, when the new regulation for department of medical and dental studies went into effect, and surviving preparatory courses as well as those university preparatory courses was merged into Faculty of Science. Nursing school reform followed the course as well.

See also 
 Education in Japan
 History of education in Japan
 Sadao Araki
 Occupation of Japan by the Supreme Commander for the Allied Powers (SCAP)

Notes

References

Bibliography
 
Kenneth B. Pyle. The Making of Modern Japan, 1996.
 
 

Occupied Japan
Reform
Reform in Japan
Education reform